The associate minister of health is a minister of the Crown and a member of the Canadian Cabinet. The office is associated with the Department of Health.

Dr. Carolyn Bennett is the first and current associate minister of health. She was appointed on October 26, 2021 and concurrently serves as the minister of mental health and addictions.

List of ministers

Reference 

Tourism